Vernon Estes (usually referred to as Vern), born January 4, 1930, is the founder and namesake of Estes Industries, the highly recognized model rocket production company, headquartered in Penrose, Colorado.

In 1957, G. Harry Stine and Orville Carlisle founded the first model rocket company, Model Missiles Incorporated, in Denver, Colorado. By 1959, the demand for rocket engines was too great for their production capabilities, so they sought out an external supplier. The Estes family business was the first fireworks company listed in the Denver phone book. Their son, Vern, took it upon himself to find a way to mechanize the production of rocket engines. He assembled a machine which he named "Mabel," capable of producing a rocket engine every 5.5 seconds. The machine was powered by compressed air and hydraulics, which was a much safer choice than electricity.

Model Missiles, Inc. was forced to fold due to a number of unwise business decisions. Although a model rocketry supplier had disappeared, the market still existed, and Estes formed his own company, Estes Industries, to fill this market. His first kit was the Astron Scout, a simple design that was so small it fit inside the cardboard tubes used for shipping rocket engines.

In 1961, Estes moved his company to a  facility near Penrose, Colorado. Although he sold his interest in Estes Industries in 1969, he remains active in model rocketry and occasionally attends launch events.

He also helped start the National Association of Rocketry, and also helped make the Model Rocket Safety Code.

References 
Craddock, Robert A. "Mr. Estes Comes to Washington." Air&Space/Smithsonian, October/November 2000, pp. 18-19.
 "Space Age Legends." Launch Magazine, September/October 2006, pp. 24–33, 60–1.

External links
Dear Mr. Estes, a website for Vern's proposed book of the same name.
Vintage Estes Rockets, A website for collectors of Vintage Estes K-Kit Rockets.
Photographs from Vern Estes' personal rocket displays.
Name That Vern, a tribute to Vern Estes and his influence on Model Rocketry.

1930 births
Model rocketry
People from Fremont County, Colorado
Living people